The 2018 Baskerville Shield was a three match rugby league series between  and  for the Baskerville Shield. The hosts, England, won the series by two matches to one.

Background

New Zealand and England previously took part in a competitive event in the 2017 Rugby League World Cup, New Zealand lost to Fiji in the quarter-finals, while England made the final, losing to Australia by a score of just 6-0.

New Zealand and England previously played against each other in a mid-season international on 23 June 2018 at Mile High Stadium in Denver, Colorado.  England won 36-18.

New Zealand was last in Great Britain for the 2016 Rugby League Four Nations. During that tournament New Zealand defeated England 17-16 in Huddersfield. They last played a three match test series against England during the 2015 New Zealand rugby league tour of Great Britain, losing the series 2-1.  With the completion of these three tests, New Zealand and England played each other four times in 2018.

Squads

New Zealand
A wider squad was named on 3 September 2018 consisting of the best New Zealand eligible players in the running to play in the upcoming tour. The final touring squad of 23 players was named on 1 October.

On 4 October, Corey Harawira-Naera withdrew from the touring 23-man squad due to a groin injury. Agnatius Paasi and Peta Hiku were subsequently added to the squad.

Ages are as of 27 October 2018, the day of the first test.

Pre-tour matches

Fixtures
New Zealand announced three matches on tour, all test matches against England.

First test
{{rugbyleaguebox
| event     = 2018 Baskerville Shield
| date      = 27 October 2018
| time      = 14:30 BST (UTC+01)
| team1     = 
| score     = 18 – 16
| report    = Report
| team2     = 
| try1      = Connor, Gildart, Tomkins
| goal1     = Connor (3/4)
| try2      = Marsters, Watene-Zelezniak
| goal2     = Johnson (4/4)
| stadium   = KCOM Stadium, Hull
| attendance= 17,649
| referee   = Robert Hicks (England)
}}

Notes:
 Oliver Gildart (England) made his Test debut.

Second test
{{rugbyleaguebox
| event     = 2018 Baskerville Shield
| date      = 4 November 2018
| time      = 14:30 GMT (UTC+00)
| team1     = 
| score     = 20 – 14
| report    = Report
| team2     = 
| try1      = Makinson (3), Connor
| goal1     = Tomkins (1/1), Connor (1/4)
| try2      = Maumalo, Watene-Zelezniak
| goal2     = Johnson (3/3)
| stadium   = Anfield, Liverpool
| attendance= 26,234
| referee   = Gerard Sutton (Australia)
}}

Third test
{{rugbyleaguebox
| event     = 2018 Baskerville Shield
| date      = 11 November 2018
| time      = 15:15 GMT (UTC+00)
| team1     = 
| score     = 0 – 34
| report    = Report
| team2     = 
| try1      = 
| goal1     = 
| try2      = Maumalo (2), J. Bromwich, Liu, Nikorima, Tapine
| goal2     = Johnson (4/5), Papali'i (1/1)
| stadium   = Elland Road, Leeds
| attendance= 32,186
| referee   = Gerard Sutton (Australia)
}}

Notes:
 Joe Greenwood (England) made his Test debut, while Isaiah Papali'i made his debut for New Zealand having previously represented Samoa.

References

New Zealand national rugby league team tours
Great Britain and France
New Zealand rugby league tour of Great Britain and France
Rugby league tours of Great Britain